Saigon Vietnam Deli is a Vietnamese restaurant in Seattle's Chinatown–International District, in the U.S. state of Washington.

Description 
The menu has included 13 variations of bánh mì (including barbecue pork, chicken, fish, and tofu varieties), beef stew, stuffed bitter melon, coconut chicken, spring rolls, bánh cuốn (rice crepes), sesame balls, and colorful sweets.

History 
The restaurant is owned by Andy and Loan Kim Nguyen.

Reception 
The Not for Tourists Guide to Seattle says, "Some of the best banh mi you'll find. Cheap, fast, and so good." In 2019, Aimee Rizzo of The Infatuation wrote, "Most of the bánh mì spots in town are known for their barbecued pork. Saigon Vietnam Deli is no exception—but their roasted pork is even better, not to mention the pickled daikon is the tangiest in the neighborhood. They also have other options, like rice plates topped with various stews, but you want this roasted pork sandwich." She and Carlo Mantuano included the deli in 2022 lists of "The Best Restaurants in the International District" and "The Best Bánh Mì in Seattle".

Jay Friedman included the business in Eater Seattle's 2022 lists of 18 "vibrant" Vietnamese restaurants in the city and 19 "amazing" restaurants in the Chinatown–International District. He also included Saigon Vietnam Deli in a 2022 overview of "where to get some great banh mi in the Seattle area". The website's Mark Van Streefkerk and Jade Yamazaki Stewart included the business in a 2022 overview of the "most underrated" restaurants in the metropolitan area and said, "Saigon Vietnam Deli has a longstanding reputation for quick, inexpensive eats... Though there's no seating area, this busy deli is the definition of a hidden gem."

See also 

 List of Vietnamese restaurants

References

External links 

 Saigon Vietnam Deli at Zomato

Chinatown–International District, Seattle
Vietnamese restaurants in Seattle